The U.S. All Star Federation (USASF) is the governing body for all star cheerleading and dance in the United States. The USASF was founded in December 2003 by cheerleading competition sponsors National Cheerleaders Association, Universal Cheerleaders Association, Cheersport, and America's Best to develop a standard set of safety rules and competition regulations and conduct the Cheerleading Worlds.

History
The first organization to call themselves "All-Stars" and go to competitions were the Q94 Rockers from Richmond, Virginia, founded in 1982 by Hilda McDaniel. All-star teams competing prior to 1987 were placed into the same divisions as teams that represented schools and sports leagues. In 1986, National Cheerleaders Association (NCA) decided to address this situation by creating a separate division for these teams lacking a sponsoring school or athletic association, calling it the 'All-Star Division' and debuting it at their 1987 competitions. As interest in these "all-star" teams grew, various organizations and competitions were formed, often with their own sets of rules and potentially lax and/or dangerous safety standards.

The USASF was formed in 2003 as a governing body for "all-star" cheerleading, funded by Varsity Spirit. The main objective was to create a standard set of rules for judging that are to be followed by all competitions sanctioned by the Federation. At the same time, cheerleading coaches from all over the country organized themselves for the same rulemaking purpose, calling themselves the National All Star Cheerleading Coaches Congress (NACCC). In 2005, the NACCC was absorbed by the USASF and became their rule-making body. In late-2006, USASF facilitated the creation of the International All Star Federation (IASF), the first international governing body for cheerleading. In 2008 a decision was made to begin a biannual process, making the 2009-10 season and the 2010-11 season the first two-year rules cycle.

In September 2022, a federal lawsuit was filed in Memphis alleging the USASF, Varsity Brands and Varsity Spirit, and others were negligent in allowing predatory behavior from coaches and gyms, violating the SafeSport Act of 2017.

Cheerleading World Championship

The foremost competition for All Star Cheer is the annual World Cheerleading Championships, also known as Cheerleading Worlds, held at the ESPN Wide World of Sports Complex in Orlando, Florida. The USASF hosted the first Cheerleading Worlds on April 24, 2004. In 2007, over 100 teams from 15 different countries competed in the event.  Teams must earn a “bid” to get to attend the world championships.

References

American cheerleading organizations